Charlie William Coulson (born 11 January 1996 in Kettering, England) is an English footballer who plays for Deeping Rangers.

Career
Coulson joined Peterborough United at the age of 13, having previously played for Rushden & Diamonds. He was drafted into first team action in April 2012, for Posh's last home game of the season, a 2–2 draw with Watford. Coulson came on as a late substitute for Joe Newell, becoming Peterborough's second youngest ever player behind Matthew Etherington. On 30 April 2012, Coulson agreed a two and a half year professional contract, with an option of an extra year, which will be enacted on his 17th birthday. Coulson had his contract cancelled by mutual consent on 2 June 2014, and he became a free agent.

On 1 November 2014, he made his debut for Deeping Rangers coming on as a substitute in the first round of the FA Vase against Wivenhoe Town. In July 2015 he signed for Ilkeston, before ending the season with St Neots Town. He returned to Deeping Rangers for the 2016–17 season.

References

External links

1996 births
Living people
Sportspeople from Kettering
Association football midfielders
Peterborough United F.C. players
Deeping Rangers F.C. players
Ilkeston F.C. players
St Neots Town F.C. players
English Football League players
Northern Football League players
Southern Football League players
English footballers